Max & Erma's is an American casual dining restaurant chain based in Columbus, Ohio. It operates throughout parts of the Eastern and Midwestern United States, and was founded in 1972 by Todd Barnum and Barry Zacks. The two businessmen purchased a local tavern in Columbus's German Village which had been operated by Max and Erma Visocnik since 1958. They retained the Max & Erma's name and created the theme restaurant which featured a converted bathtub that served as a sundae bar.

Max & Erma's was purchased by Pittsburgh-based equity investor G&R Acquisition Inc. in a $10.2 million deal in April 2008. The company declared Chapter 11 bankruptcy on October 26, 2009. It was acquired by American Blue Ribbon Holdings, owners of the Village Inn and Bakers Square restaurant chains, in 2010.

On January 25, 2016, it was announced that Glacier Restaurant Group had purchased ownership of Max & Erma's from American Blue Ribbon Holdings. This sale occurred after the closing of 19 of the restaurant's locations that were described as underperforming.

On July 28, 2017, Glacier announced that the original German Village Max & Erma's location will close on August 7, 2017, citing a lack of financial viability.

Gallery

References

External links
 Max & Erma's website

Fidelity National Financial
Companies based in the Columbus, Ohio metropolitan area
Restaurants in Ohio
Economy of the Eastern United States
Regional restaurant chains in the United States
Restaurant franchises
Restaurants established in 1972
1972 establishments in Ohio
Companies that filed for Chapter 11 bankruptcy in 2009